Professor Hugo Lederer (16 November 1871, in Znaim – 1 August 1940, in Berlin) was an Austro-Hungarian-born German sculptor.

Lederer studied in Dresden under sculptor John Schilling from 1890, then briefly under Christian Behrens.  His greatest success came in 1902 with the commission for the Bismarck Monument in the center of Hamburg.  In 1919 Lederer went to the Academy of Arts in Berlin; among his students was Josef Thorak. Lederer's last major work was for the Krupp organization.

Lederer is buried in Wilmersdorfer Waldfriedhof in Stahnsdorf near Berlin.

Sculptural works
 Schicksal, 1896, Ohlsdorf Cemetery, Hamburg
 Bismarck-Denkmal, 1902–1906, Elbhöhe, Hamburg (with architect Emil Schaudt)
 Fechter-Brunnen, 1904, Universitätsplatz, Breslau
 Kaiser Friedrich III.-Reiterstandbild, 1911, Kaiserplatz, Aachen
 Löwendenkmal, Theodor Tantzen-Platz, Oldenburg
 Ringer, 1908, Heerstraße, Berlin-Charlottenburg
 Bismarck-Standbild, 1911, in Wuppertal-Barmen
 Gedenkrelief für Freiherr vom Stein, 1914, Rathaus Berlin-Schöneberg
 Bärenbrunnen, 1928, Werderscher Markt, Berlin-Mitte
 Säugende Bärin, 1929, Rathaus/Finanzamt, Berlin-Zehlendorf
 Grabmal Gustav Stresemann, Friedensnobelpreisträger, 1929–1930, Luisenstädtischer Friedhof, Berlin-Kreuzberg
 Fruchtbarkeits-Brunnen, 1927–1934, Arnswalder Platz, Prenzlauer Berg, Berlin
 Regiments-Kriegerdenkmal 1914–1918 des Grenadier-Regiments zu Pferde (Neumärkisches) No. 3, 1923 eingeweiht, Treptow a. Rega, Farther Pomerania
 Kriegerdenkmal 1914–1918, c. 1925, Marktplatz, Altdamm, Farther Pomerania

Gallery

Further reading
 Bornemann, Felix: Hugo Lederer: sein Leben und sein Werk. – Geislingen/Steige : Südmähr. Landschaftsrat, 1971
 Jochum-Bohrmann, Ilonka: Hugo Lederer: ein deutschnationaler Bildhauer des 20. Jahrhunderts. – Frankfurt/M : Lang, 1990. –  
 Krey, Hans: Hugo Lederer : ein Meister der Plastik. – Berlin: Schroeder, 1932
 Leipziger Illustrirte Zeitung issue 3564 dated October 19, 1911
 Höft, Manfred: 'Altdammer Denkmäler' – in: Pommersche Zeitung dated April 20, 1985
 Geschichte des Kavallerie-Regiments 6, bearbeitet von Rittmeister Bronsart von Schellendorf, Schwedt a. O. 1937

External links

hugo-lederer.de/en

1871 births
1940 deaths
People from Znojmo
German sculptors
German male sculptors
20th-century sculptors
Recipients of the Pour le Mérite (civil class)